Elettaria cardamomum, commonly known as green or true cardamom, is a herbaceous, perennial plant in the ginger family, native to southern India. It is the most common of the species whose seeds are used as a spice called cardamom. It is cultivated widely in tropical regions and reportedly naturalized in Réunion, Indochina, and Costa Rica.

Growth

Use
The green seed pods of the plant are dried and the seeds inside the pod are used in Indian and other Asian cuisines, either whole or ground. It is the most widely cultivated species of cardamom; for other types and uses, see cardamom.

True cardamom may have been used in Ayurveda medicine as early as the 4th century BC. Ground cardamom is an ingredient in many Indian curries and is a primary contributor to the flavour of masala chai. In Iran and India, cardamom is used to flavour coffee and tea.

In addition to its native range, it is grown in Nepal, Vietnam, Cambodia, Thailand, Sri Lanka, and Central America. In India, the states of Sikkim and Kerala are the main producers of cardamom; they rank highest both in cultivated area and in production.

Ecology 
E. cardamomum is used as a food plant by the larvae of the moth Endoclita hosei.

Varieties

The three natural varieties of green cardamom plants are:
 Malabar (Nadan/native), as the name suggests, is the native variety of Kerala. These plants have floral racemes (which bear the pods) that grow horizontally along the ground.
 Mysore, as the name suggests, is a native variety of Karnataka. These plants have floral racemes  which grow vertically upwards. The Mysore variety has declined, however, in the past few decades owing to the emergence of the more resistant and better-yielding 'Green Gold' variety, and which is the most common form of cardamom harvested in Kerala.
 Vazhuka is a naturally occurring hybrid between Malabar and Mysore varieties, and the panicles grow neither vertically nor horizontally, but in between.

Recently, a few planters isolated high-yielding plants and started multiplying them on a large scale. The most popular high-yielding variety is 'Njallani', which is a unique high-yielding cardamom variety developed by an Indian farmer, Sebastian Joseph, at Kattappana in the South Indian state of Kerala. K. J. Baby of Idukki District, Kerala, has developed a purely white-flowered variety of Vazhuka type green cardamom having higher yield than 'Njallani'. The variety has high adaptability to different shade conditions and can also be grown in waterlogged areas.

References

External links
 
 
 University of Melbourne: Sorting Elettaria names

Alpinioideae
Spices
Flora of India (region)
Plants described in 1753
Taxa named by Carl Linnaeus
Medicinal plants of Asia